Bloom is the second studio album by Australian singer Troye Sivan, released on 31 August 2018 through EMI Music Australia and Capitol Records. The album follows up his 2015 debut studio album, Blue Neighbourhood, and features guest appearances from Gordi and Ariana Grande. It was preceded by the release of the singles "My My My!", "The Good Side", "Bloom", "Dance to This" and "Animal".

At the ARIA Music Awards of 2018, the album was nominated for three awards; Album of the Year, Best Male Artist and Best Pop Release.

Composition
Bloom has been called Sivan's "sex album", as well as "darker", "more guitar-driven" and "more danceable" than his previous material. It has also been described as containing material about defiant gay expression; the first song, "Seventeen", is about a sexual experience Sivan had with a man he met on Grindr. Sivan wrote most of the album with American musician Leland and Canadian musician Allie X. The album's production was primarily handled by Bram Inscore, Oscar Görres, Oscar Holter and Ariel Rechtshaid.

Release and promotion

"My My My!" was released as the lead single from the album on 10 January 2018, and was accompanied by a music video directed by Grant Singer. The second single "The Good Side", was released nine days later. It is an acoustic track about a breakup, with Sivan explaining that the song is an open letter to an ex-boyfriend. The title track "Bloom", a song about anal sex, which was promoted by the hashtag "#BopsBoutBottoming" that was trending on Twitter, was released on 2 May as the third single. "Dance to This", featuring American singer Ariana Grande, was released on 13 June as the album's fourth single. The fifth single, "Animal", was released on 9 August. On 14 June, Sivan announced a Target special edition would be released featuring two new songs, "This This" and "Running Shoes". The album was released on 31 August 2018 by EMI Music Australia and Capitol Records.

Sivan promoted the album via the Bloom Tour, which began on 21 September in Irving, Texas, and ended on 30 November 2019 in Chengdu, China.

Critical reception

Bloom received widespread critical acclaim. At Metacritic, which assigns a normalised rating out of 100 to reviews from mainstream publications, the album has an average score of 85, based on 15 reviews, indicating "universal acclaim".

Giving the album a perfect score, The Independents Douglas Greenwood wrote, "Making perfect pop isn't easy, but Troye Sivan is a star who's done his homework. With one foot in pop's past and another in its present, Bloom is a record that could turn its considerate maker into one of mainstream music's most revered and fascinating talents." AllMusic critic Neil Z. Yeung stated that "Bloom is an unambiguous statement from Sivan, clear in its intent to celebrate the highs and lows of queer love through the eyes of a proud pop star in the making." Annie Zaleski from The A.V. Club opined that "Blooms beauty and gifts reveal themselves gradually over time."

Writing for The Guardian, Alexis Petridis stated that "the results are characterful", elaborating: "Bloom is done and dusted in 35 crisp minutes – a time at which some pop albums are reaching their mid-point – and feels like a coherent, artist-led album rather than a bet-spreading collection of songs designed to hit every popular musical base." Brittany Spanos of Rolling Stone said, "Well beyond the already stellar dismissal of heteronormative storylines in pop love stories, Sivan finds a wealth of ways to bring about fresh reflections on age-old themes with undeniable charisma." The Line of Best Fit writer Claire Biddles stated, "Bloom is an exceptional pop album, but maybe more importantly it's a beacon for queer people who struggle to reconcile our neuroses – societal and personal – with our potential for joy and love."

Year-end lists

Commercial performance
Bloom debuted at number three in Australia, making it Sivan's highest-charting studio album in his home country. It opened at number four on the US Billboard 200 with 72,000 album-equivalent units, including 59,000 pure album sales. It is his highest-charting release and best sales week to date on the Billboard 200.

Track listing

Notes
  signifies a co-producer
  signifies an additional producer
  signifies a vocal producer

Charts

Weekly charts

Year-end charts

Certifications

Release history

References

2018 albums
Troye Sivan albums
Albums produced by Ariel Rechtshaid
Albums produced by Alex Hope (songwriter)
Albums produced by Jam City
Albums produced by Michael Uzowuru